Punta Lavina (French: Tour de Lavina - sometimes referred to as Torre di Lavina in Italian) (3,308m) is a mountain of the Graian Alps located on the border of Aosta Valley and Piedmont, Italy. It is located between the Aostan Cogne Valley in the north and the Piedmontese Soana Valley in the South. The mountain has an elegant pyramidal shape which is easily recognisable from both Canavese and Turin. It lies entirely within the Gran Paradiso National Park.

References

Mountains of the Graian Alps
Alpine three-thousanders
Mountains of Aosta Valley
Mountains of Piedmont